Artemis Gounaki (Greek Άρτεμις Γουνάκη; born 7 April 1967 in Munich) is a Greek-German singer, vocal coach, songwriter, composer, and arranger who has done much of her work in Greek. Gounaki's father was born on the Greek island of Crete.

Artemis Gounaki is a vocal coach and has participated in various Popstars seasons in German, Greek and Swiss television such as on RTL II and ProSieben. Being a vocal-producer and arranger, Gounaki has worked with well-known German bands such as Bro'Sis, Preluders, Nu Pagadi, Overground, H-Blockx and Guano Apes). Many of the bands have already reached gold and platinum status in Germany. Gounaki also supports the finalists and winners of Popstars in Switzerland and Greece.

Moreover, she was singing, writing and composing for her band Illegal Aliens with Marco Minnemann, who is her former husband.

She lives in Munich, (Germany), Athens, Greece, Zurich, Switzerland, and in Crete. She has one son.

Career
Gounaki had worked with many artists even before her Popstars debut. She worked with Henning Wehland on his voice for his bands' recordings Fly Eyes of his band H-Blockx. After that Gounaki coached, arranged and produced the vocals of Sandra Nasic, singer of the band Guano Apes for Don't Give Me Names and Walking on a Thin Line and was their steady tour coach and friend during their worldwide tours ( 1998–2002).

In 2001, Gounaki became the vocal coach of the German TV show Popstars. Her work helped the winning band Bro'Sis selling over 1,500,000 copies of their debut album Never Forget within three days. Later, she extended her work to different countries. In 2003, she moved to Athens to become the vocal coach of the Greek version of Popstars and to work on the vocal-production of the winning band Hi-5.

During that time, she also worked on the German Popstars show, which took place in Orlando, Florida US and created the two bands Preluders and Overground. After finishing that production, Gounaki went to Greece to arrange and to produce the Christmas CD of Hi-5, Mia Nihta San K'iafti.

After this, Gounaki was one of the judges on the Greek TV Show Eurostars. The show was won by Apostolos Psihraimis who was supposed to represent the country in the Eurovision Song Contest 2004. However, ERT internally chose superstar Sakis Rouvas and sent him to the Eurovision Song Contest in Istanbul, where Rouvas finished in third place, equalling Greece's best result up to that point.

When she returned to Germany, Gounaki coached, arranged and recorded the new Popstars band Nu Pagadi.

Gounaki cooperates with music producers and musicians such as Greg Manning, Toni Cottura or Marc Mozart, Lou Bega, T.M.Stevens, Leslie Mandoki, Uwe Fahrenkrog-Petersen, Thorsten Brötzmann or Peter Ries and works for major record companies like Sony BMG or Universal Music.

However, she took a break for nine months to spend more time with her family. In October 2005, Gounaki published a book called Singen? Kann jeder! (Everyone can sing), which she had written while she was on hiatus. The following month she took up studies at the University of Munich to study architecture.

Together with German Pop Idol Alexander Klaws and German singer Jeanette Biedermann, Gounaki returned to television with the show Beste Stimme gesucht (Best voice wanted) on KI.KA, a German TV channel for children. The show scouted for children with a talent for singing. Gounaki also worked very closely with Jeanette Biedermann during her Bad Girls Club Tour 2006 as her voice coach. Her next TV project as vocal coach and a vocal-producer was a Swiss audition show called Musicstar in winter 2006/07 on SF1.

TV
 2001 – Popstars/ RTL2 Germany (Bro'Sis)
 2003 – Popstars/ MegaTV Greece (Hi-5)
 2003 – Popstars "Das Duell"/ Pro Sieben Germany (Preluders, Overground)
 2004 – Eurostar/ NET Greece (Sakis Rouvas)
 2004 – Popstars "Jetzt Oder Nie"/ Pro Sieben Germany (Nu Pagadi)
 2005 – Die Burg/ Pro Sieben Germany
 2005 – Kika Live/ KI.KA Germany
 2006/2007 – Musicstar/ SF1 Switzerland

Books 
 Singen? Kann Jeder! (Everyone can sing), Schwarzkopf & Schwarzkopf Verlag, 2005,

Discography

Certifications
 2010 – Platinum for Sportfreunde Stiller MTV Unplugged in New York (Album – the 14th best-selling album in Germany of 2009)
 2004 – Gold for Nu Pagadi Your Dark Side (Album)
 2004 – Gold for Nu Pagadi Sweetest Poison (Single)
 2003 – Gold for Preluders Girls in the House (Album)
 2003 – Gold for Preluders Everyday Girl (Single)
 2003 – 3× Platinum for Hi-5 Hi-5 (Album)
 2003 – 2× Platinum for Hi-5 Ksero ti zitao (Single)
 2003 – Gold for Hi-5 Mia nihta san ki afti (Album)
 2002 – Gold for Guano Apes Walking on a Thin Line (Album)
 2001 – Platinum for Bro'Sis Never Forget (Album)
 2001 – 2× Platinum for Bro'Sis I Believe (Single)
 2000 – Gold for Guano Apes Don't Give Me Names (Album)

External links
   Artemis Gounaki Official Webpage
  Artemis Gounaki Official MySpace Site
 Literature from and about Artemis Gounaki in German card index of German National Library
   Vocal coaching on the official  MusikStar webpage
   Artemis on Ki.KA

1967 births
Living people
Talent managers
German people of Greek descent
Greek record producers
Vocal coaches
Modern Greek-language singers
English-language singers from Germany
Musicians from Munich
Ludwig Maximilian University of Munich alumni
German women pop singers
German women record producers